Malicious is a 2018 American horror thriller film written and directed by Michael Winnick and starring Bojana Novakovic, Josh Stewart, Melissa Bolona and Delroy Lindo.

Cast
Bojana Novakovic as Lisa
Josh Stewart as Adam
Delroy Lindo as Dr. Clark
Melissa Bolona as Becky
Luke Edwards as James Harper
Yvette Yates as Emily Harper

References

External links
 
 

American horror thriller films
2018 films
2018 horror thriller films
2010s English-language films
2010s American films